Chronos (also known as Chronos: A Tapestry of Time) is a shoot 'em up developed by The Radical Tubes and published by Mastertronic for the ZX Spectrum and Amstrad CPC in 1987. The music was scored by Tim Follin. The game received mixed reviews upon release.

Plot
Seven Ruling Lords create their own races, with Wodan creating man and Chronos creating the "Mystical Dimension Weavers".

Development
The game was scored by the then fifteen-year old Tim Follin.

Reception

Chronos received mixed reviews.

References

External links 
 
 
 
 Z80-Artistic

1987 video games
Amstrad CPC games
Mastertronic games
Shoot 'em ups
ZX Spectrum games
Video games scored by Tim Follin
Video games developed in the United Kingdom